Karen Aleksanyan (born 17 June 1980 in Gyumri, Armenian SSR) is an Armenian retired football midfielder. Aleksanyan spent the majority of his career at Armenian Premier League club FC Shirak.

Career

Club
Aleksanyan announced his retirement from football on 7 January 2017 to take up a coaching role at Shirak.

International
Aleksanyan represented Armenia on 25 occasions between 2002 and 2008, making his debut in an away friendly match against Andorra on 7 June 2002.

Career statistics

International

Statistics accurate as of match played 11 October 2008

References

External links
 

1980 births
Living people
Armenian footballers
Armenia international footballers
FC Shirak players
FC Pyunik players
FC Zimbru Chișinău players
FC Urartu players
FC Torpedo-BelAZ Zhodino players
Ulisses FC players
Armenian Premier League players
Armenian expatriate footballers
Expatriate footballers in Moldova
Expatriate footballers in Belarus
Armenian expatriate sportspeople in Moldova
Armenian expatriate sportspeople in Belarus
Association football midfielders
Footballers from Gyumri